June 1976 is a live album by the rock band the Grateful Dead.  Packaged as a box set, it comprises five complete concerts on 15 CDs.  It was recorded from June 10 to June 19, 1976 at the Boston Music Hall in Boston, the Beacon Theatre in New York City, and the Capitol Theatre in Passaic, New Jersey.  It was released on March 20, 2020 in a limited edition of 12,000 copies.

The shows included in the box set were part of the Grateful Dead's first concert tour following a year-and-a-half period during which they performed live only a few times.  This tour also marked the return of Mickey Hart after a five year absence from the band.

June 1976 concert tour 

In June 1976 the Grateful Dead played a concert tour, their first since October 1974.  They performed shows at these venues:
Paramount Theatre, Portland, Oregon – June 3, 4
Boston Music Hall, Boston, Massachusetts – June 9, 10, 11, 12
Beacon Theatre, New York, New York – June 14, 15
Capitol Theatre, Passaic, New Jersey – June 17, 18, 19
Tower Theater, Upper Darby, Pennsylvania – June 21, 22, 23, 24
Auditorium Theatre, Chicago, Illinois – June 26, 27, 28, 29

Critical reception 
On AllMusic, Timothy Monger said, "With percussionist Mickey Hart back in the lineup full-time and a clutch of new material both from the Blues for Allah LP as well as various members' solo and side projects, the rejuvenated Dead set out to reestablish themselves on the road with a summer 1976 tour.  Captured during a ten-day run by longtime engineer Betty Cantor-Jackson, this set featured previously unreleased complete-show recordings..."

Track listing 
Disc 1
Boston Music Hall, June 10, 1976 – first set:
"Promised Land" (Chuck Berry) – 3:51
"Sugaree" (Jerry Garcia, Robert Hunter) – 9:52
"Cassidy" (Bob Weir, John Perry Barlow) – 5:00
"They Love Each Other" (Garcia, Hunter) – 8:29
"The Music Never Stopped" (Weir, Barlow) – 5:47
"Brown-Eyed Women" (Garcia, Hunter) – 5:37
"Lazy Lightning" > (Weir, Barlow) – 2:56
"Supplication" (Weir, Barlow) – 4:26
"Row Jimmy" (Garcia, Hunter) – 9:23
"Big River" (Johnny Cash) – 6:28
"Mission in the Rain" (Garcia, Hunter) – 7:27
"Looks Like Rain" (Weir, Barlow) – 9:08
Disc 2
"Might as Well" (Garcia, Hunter) – 6:11
Boston Music Hall, June 10, 1976 – second set:
"Samson and Delilah" (traditional, arranged by Weir) – 7:18
"Help on the Way" > (Garcia, Hunter) – 4:47
"Slipknot!" > (Garcia, Keith Godchaux, Bill Kreutzmann, Phil Lesh, Weir) – 6:59
"Franklin's Tower" (Garcia, Kreutzmann, Hunter) – 11:17
"Let It Grow" (Weir, Barlow) – 11:36
"Friend of the Devil" (Garcia, John Dawson, Hunter) – 8:11
Disc 3
"Playing in the Band" > (Weir, Mickey Hart, Hunter) – 14:37
"Dancing in the Street" > (William "Mickey" Stevenson, Marvin Gaye, Ivy Jo Hunter) – 11:02
"U.S. Blues" (Garcia, Hunter) – 5:49
Disc 4
Boston Music Hall, June 11, 1976 – first set:
"Might as Well" (Garcia, Hunter) – 6:09
"Mama Tried" (Merle Haggard) – 3:24
"Tennessee Jed" (Garcia, Hunter) – 8:59
"Cassidy" (Weir, Barlow) – 5:06
"Candyman" (Garcia, Hunter) – 8:28
"Big River" (Cash) – 6:18
"Scarlet Begonias" (Garcia, Hunter) – 10:16
"Looks Like Rain" (Weir, Barlow) – 8:53
"It Must Have Been the Roses" (Hunter) – 7:11
"Lazy Lightning" > (Weir, Barlow) – 2:53
"Supplication" (Weir, Barlow) – 5:21
"Brown-Eyed Women" (Garcia, Hunter) – 5:09
Disc 5
"Promised Land" (Berry) – 3:56
Boston Music Hall, June 11, 1976 – second set:
"St. Stephen" > (Garcia, Lesh, Hunter) – 9:49
"Dancing in the Street" > (Stevenson, Gaye, I. J. Hunter) – 11:58
"The Music Never Stopped" (Weir, Barlow) – 5:42
"Ship of Fools" (Garcia, Hunter) – 7:11
Disc 6
"Samson and Delilah" (traditional, arranged by Weir) – 7:09
"Sugaree" (Hunter, Garcia) – 11:05
"Sugar Magnolia" > (Weir, Hunter) – 6:04
"Eyes of the World" > (Garcia, Hunter) – 13:13
"Stella Blue" (Garcia, Hunter) – 10:49
"Sunshine Daydream" (Weir, Hunter) – 3:29
Boston Music Hall, June 11, 1976 – encore:
"Johnny B. Goode" (Berry) – 4:15
Disc 7
Beacon Theatre, June 14, 1976 – first set:
"Cold Rain and Snow" (traditional, arranged by Grateful Dead) – 6:49
"Mama Tried" (Haggard) – 3:45
"Row Jimmy" (Garcia, Hunter) – 10:13
"Cassidy" (Weir, Barlow) – 5:08
"Brown-Eyed Women" (Garcia, Hunter) – 5:26
"Big River" (Cash) – 6:21
"Might as Well" (Garcia, Hunter) – 6:00
"Lazy Lightning" > (Weir, Barlow) – 2:56
"Supplication" (Weir, Barlow) – 4:53
"Tennessee Jed" (Garcia, Hunter) – 8:57
Disc 8
"Playing in the Band" (Weir, Hart, Hunter) – 19:40
Beacon Theatre, June 14, 1976 – second set:
"The Wheel" (Garcia, Hunter) – 6:09
"Samson and Delilah" (traditional, arranged by Weir) – 6:36
"High Time" (Garcia, Hunter) – 9:52
"The Music Never Stopped" (Weir, Barlow) – 5:26
"Crazy Fingers" > (Garcia, Hunter) – 11:33
Disc 9
"Dancing in the Street" > (Stevenson, Gaye, I. J. Hunter) – 12:37
"Cosmic Charlie" (Garcia, Hunter) – 8:47
"Help on the Way" > (Garcia, Hunter) – 4:55
"Slipknot!" > (Garcia, Godchaux, Kreutzmann, Lesh, Weir) – 13:00
"Franklin's Tower" > (Garcia, Kreutzmann, Hunter) – 11:03
"Around and Around" (Berry) – 7:18
Beacon Theatre, June 14, 1976 – encore:
"U.S. Blues" (Garcia, Hunter) – 5:52
Disc 10
Beacon Theatre, June 15, 1976 – first set:
"Promised Land" (Berry) – 4:26
"Sugaree" (Garcia, Hunter) – 9:44
"Cassidy" (Weir, Barlow) – 4:58
"Candyman" (Garcia, Hunter) – 7:48
"The Music Never Stopped" (Weir, Barlow) – 5:54
"It Must Have Been the Roses" (Hunter) – 7:16
"Looks Like Rain" (Weir, Barlow) – 7:06
"Tennessee Jed" (Garcia, Hunter) – 9:44
"Let It Grow" > (Weir, Barlow) – 13:14
"Might as Well" (Garcia, Hunter) – 5:26
Disc 11
Beacon Theatre, June 15, 1976 – second set:
"St. Stephen" >  (Garcia, Lesh, Hunter) – 11:11
"Not Fade Away" > (Buddy Holly, Norman Petty) – 12:15
"Stella Blue" (Garcia, Hunter) – 13:53
"Samson and Delilah" (traditional, arranged by Weir) – 6:25
"Friend of the Devil" (Garcia, Dawson, Hunter) – 8:24
Disc 12
"Dancing in the Street" > (Stevenson, Gaye, I. J. Hunter) – 13:01
"The Wheel" > (Garcia, Hunter) – 4:44
"Sugar Magnolia" (Weir, Hunter) – 6:05
"Scarlet Begonias" > (Garcia, Hunter) – 4:48
"Sunshine Daydream" (Weir, Hunter) – 3:39
Beacon Theatre, June 15, 1976 – encore:
"Johnny B. Goode" (Berry) – 4:12
Disc 13
Capitol Theatre, June 19, 1976 – first set:
"Help on the Way" > (Garcia, Hunter) – 5:50
"Slipknot!" > (Garcia, Godchaux, Kreutzmann, Lesh, Weir) – 6:30
"Franklin's Tower" > (Garcia, Kreutzmann, Hunter) – 9:38
"The Music Never Stopped" (Weir, Barlow) – 6:05
"Brown-Eyed Women" (Garcia, Hunter) – 5:27
"Cassidy" (Weir, Barlow) – 4:55
"They Love Each Other" (Garcia, Hunter) – 7:34
"Looks Like Rain" (Weir, Barlow) – 8:02
"Tennessee Jed" (Garcia, Hunter) – 8:29
Disc 14
"Playing in the Band" (Weir, Hart, Hunter) – 19:14
Capitol Theatre, June 19, 1976 – second set:
"Might as Well" (Garcia, Hunter) – 6:25
"Samson and Delilah" (traditional, arranged by Weir) – 7:07
"High Time" (Garcia, Hunter) – 9:38
Disc 15
"Let It Grow" > (Weir, Barlow) – 13:09
"Dancing in the Street" > (Stevenson, Gaye, I. J. Hunter) – 10:20
"Cosmic Charlie" (Garcia, Hunter) – 9:11
"Around and Around" > (Berry) – 6:28
"Goin' Down the Road Feeling Bad" > (traditional, arranged by Grateful Dead) – 7:16
"One More Saturday Night" (Weir) – 4:58
Capitol Theatre, June 19, 1976 – encore:
"Not Fade Away" (Holly, Petty) – 8:03

Personnel 
Grateful Dead
Jerry Garcia – guitar, vocals
Donna Jean Godchaux – vocals 
Keith Godchaux – keyboards 
Mickey Hart – drums 
Bill Kreutzmann – drums
Phil Lesh – bass
Bob Weir – guitar, vocals
Production
Produced by Grateful Dead
Produced for release by David Lemieux
Associate Producer: Ivette Ramos
Recording: Betty Cantor-Jackson
Mastering: Jeffrey Norman
Tape restoration and speed correction: Jamie Howarth, John Chester
Art direction: Lisa Glines, Steve Vance, Justin Helton
Artwork: Justin Helton
Package design: Steve Vance
Photos: Grant Gouldon
Liner notes: Jesse Jarnow

Charts

References 

Grateful Dead live albums
Rhino Records live albums
2020 live albums